The Calibres de France ("French calibers") was a system of standardization of cannons in France, established by King Francis I of France from about 1525. The objective was to simplify and codify cannonry, in order to facilitate production. On 26 September 1526, Francis I wrote about the artillerye de mon calibre ("Artillery of my caliber"), and an even earlier mention is known from 1512. The Calibres de France were formalized in an ordinance of 1552.

Six standard sizes were defined: the cannon (Canon), the "grand" culverin (Grande couleuvrine), the "bastard" culverin (Couleuvrine bâtarde), the "middle" culverin (Couleuvrine moyenne), the Falconet (Faucon), and the (Fauconneau).

The system was expanded by an ordinance dated 27 November 1572, and an edict dates December 1601.

The 6-guns Calibres de France system was still in place at the time of Louis XIII, which was later developed to an 18-guns system.

The system was phased out with the Keller system in 1666, and the De Vallière system on 7 October 1732.

Other models

Notes

Artillery of France